Abdalata is a village in the Çorum District of Çorum Province in Turkey. Its population is 483 (2022).

References

Villages in Çorum District